HPJ may refer to:
 .HPJ, a file extension used by Microsoft WinHelp
 Hewlett-Packard Journal
 High Plains Journal
 Women's Defence Forces, part of the Kurdistan Free Life Party